Mildred Anne Butler  (11 January 1858 – 11 October 1941) was an Irish artist, who worked in watercolour and oil of landscape, genre and animal subjects. Butler was born and spent most of her life in  Kilmurry, Thomastown, County Kilkenny and was associated with the Newlyn School of painters.

Mildred Anne's en plein air style is dominated by the theme of nature and reflects scenes of domesticity around the family home in Kilmurry. She achieved distinction in her lifetime and exhibited in major galleries in Ireland and England. Among her patrons were Queen Mary of Teck and Louis IV, Grand Duke of Hesse.

She became a member of the Royal Academy in 1893. In 1896, Butler's Morning Bath was exhibited at the Royal Academy. It was the first work by a female artist to be purchased by the trustees of the Chantrey Bequest and was then presented to the Tate. She became an associate member of the Royal Watercolour Society in 1896 and was granted full membership in 1937.

She was one of the first academicians elected by the Ulster Academy of Arts in 1930. She virtually stopped painting by the 1930s due to arthritis and died in 1941, aged 83. Around four hundred pieces of her work were sold as part of the artist's studio sale in 1980. She is celebrated in a postage stamp by An Post.

Life 
Mildred Anne was born in 1858 in Kilmurry, a Georgian House near Thomastown and was the youngest daughter of Captain Henry Butler, a grandson of the Edmund Butler, 11th Viscount Mountgarret. Knowledge of Butler's life and working methods are almost entirely on the watercolours themselves and on her diaries, which are preserved for most years between 1892 and 1938. Butler's quirky titles such as Ancient Rubbish, A Tit-Bit and Chucked; Green Eyed Jealousy: Ravens amongst trees show the artist's playful sensibility. Her father, Henry Butler, was an amateur artist favouring subjects from nature he encountered on journeys abroad, in particular exotic plants and animals. Butler spent most of her life in the family home at Kilmurry with frequent trips to England and the continent. She continued painting until the 1930s when she stopped painting due to arthritis and died in 1941, aged 83.

Career 

Butler's father Henry may have encouraged her to paint in her youth but her artistic training began in London in the late 1880s with the watercolourist Paul Jacob Naftel, whom she credited for her understanding of watercolours. Butler like her friend Rose Barton, who also studied under Naftel, did not follow his choice of landscape, instead she devoted herself to cattle, birds, and flower gardens. She continued her studies at Westminster School of Art under William Frank Calderon who specialised in animal painting and later opened a school of animal painting.  At Frank Calderon's School she studied the subject of cows, and it was that work for which she was elected to the Old Society, the Royal Academy.

In her late twentieths, Butler made annual visits to the continent until the outbreak of war. She travelled to  France, Belgium, Switzerland and Italy. In Paris, she studied drawing, figure drawing and fine art painting.  While in Paris she became associated with the Newlyn school and went on to spend the summers of 1894 and 1895 in Newlyn in Cornwall.  Newlyn at that time was the centre for a group of artists who were interested in plein-air subjects, many of whom had previously studied in France. She was attached to the Newlyn School, and Norman Garstin's studio in particular alongside contemporaries such as Walter Osborne and Sir John Lavery. Garstin like Osborne had been a pupil of the Antwerp master Charles Verlat. Butler established a friendship with Luke Fildes, Stanhope Forbes whom she met at Newlyn. The influence of the Limerick-born Garstin, and Forbes, and the contact with the Newlyn School informed Butler's development and remained an important influence on her work throughout her life.

Butler continuously exhibited throughout her career and proved herself to be a keen business woman capable of marketing her watercolours successfully with patrons such as Queen Mary of Teck and Louis IV, Grand Duke of Hesse. She was a member of the Society of Lady Artists. She was one of the first nine academicians elected by the Ulster Academy of Arts in 1930. She was granted full membership into the Royal Watercolour Society in 1937, having been an associate member since 1896.

Style 

Butler was a painter in oil and watercolour of landscape, genre and animal subjects. Her range of work was dominated by the theme of nature and her subject matter reflected the scenes of domesticity surrounding her Kilmurry home.  Butler's house was a huge source of inspiration throughout her life, its garden and surroundings, provided passion for many of her paintings which often included the surrounding gardens, pasture and countryside. These themes interested her particularly remained a constant subject. She also did genre views of villages and towns on the continent.

Butler painted en plein air with instils her work with animated freshness, which she depicts with a degree of realism and expression. Paintings such as Meditation (1889) were considered revolutionary by the art establishment and by critics of the day.  The critic of the magazine Hearth and Home described her habit of painting in the open air, rare at the time, and said it give an actuality and a freshness to the painting.

Works and exhibitions

Butler's principal works have been A Sheltered Corner (1891) R.A., A High Court of Justice (1892) R.A., Green-Eyed Jealousy (1894) R.A., The Morning Bath (1896) R.A.,  Raiders  from the Rookery (1896) R.A., Cead Mile Failte (1898) R.A. Works that she was elected to the R.W.S. in 1896 include Dull December, Loiterers  and Beside the Pond. Sunshine Holiday (1898) R.W.S. was another notable work. Her works appears in a number of collections including Morning Bath in the Tate and paintings in the National Gallery of Ireland, the Ulster Museum in Belfast and the Hugh Lane Gallery in Dublin. A small watercolour of crows hangs in Queen Mary's Dolls' House at Windsor. Throughout her career Butler's works were showcased as far abroad as the United States and Japan.

She first exhibited at the Dudley Gallery in Piccadilly. She exhibited in various galleries and institutions including the Royal Hibernian Academy, the Watercolour Society of Ireland, the Belfast Ramblers' Sketching Club, the Royal Academy (1889–1902) and the Royal Watercolour Society. In 1906 she exhibited at the Watercolour Society of Ireland, in Dublin, with works such as The Garden Cart and later that winter in London, at the  Old Water-Colour Society where the exhibition included pieces such as Where the Grass Grows Green. In Spring 1919 an exhibition at the Royal Watercolour Society, London, included Tramore  Strand, Low water (1889) The Delegates (1923) was exhibited at the New Irish Salon.

In 1980, watercolours, drawings and sketches, together with notes, letters and diaries were sold as part of the artist's studio sale. Some were sold in Ireland and others at a studio sale at Christie's in London. The National Gallery of Ireland purchased seven fine watercolours for its permanent collection. Fota House in Cork contains one of her works. An Exhibition of Butler's work was held by the Kilkenny Art Gallery Society at Kilkenny Castle in June 1981 which included pieces such as Where the Grass Grows Green (1904) It was further exhibited at the Bank of Ireland, Baggot Street, Dublin in August 1981 and at Christies, King Street, London in September 1981. In 1987 Kilkenny Art Gallery, Kilkenny, presented an exhibition  Mildred Anne Butler, which included  Cats Chasing Birds (1918). Between August–September 1987 the Crawford Municipal Art Gallery, Cork, presented an exhibition  Mildred Anne Butler 1858-1941. An Irish Edwardian Watercolour Collection which included Figures beside a horse and chaise (1896) In April to June 1988 Ulster Museum and Art Gallery, Belfast, presented an exhibition  Mildred Anne Butler which included  Cats Chasing Birds (1918). She is celebrated on a Postage stamp in an An Post collection for female Irish artists.

Selected works 

{{plainlist|
 A Sheltered Corner (1891) R.A.
 A High Court of Justice (1892) R.A.
 Green-Eyed Jealousy (1894) R.A.
 The Morning Bath (1896) R.A., Tate, London.
 Beside the Pond (1896) R.W.S. Election 1896
 Dull December (1896) R.W.S. Election 1896
 Loiterers (1896) R.W.S. Election 1896
 Raiders from the Rookery (1896) R.A.
 Sunshine Holiday (1898) R.W.S.
 Cead Mile Failte (1898) R.A.
 Toll from the Turnip Cart (1896)
 The Wanderers (1898), Hugh Lane Gallery, Dublin.
 The Garden Cart
 Doves outside the Conservatory, Kilmurry
 Tramore  Strand, Low water 1889
 Where the Grass Grows Green
 The Delegates (1923)
 Dandelions and Scillas
 The Garden Path (1922)
 Procession through the bluebells
 Madonna Lilies
 Side-cars
 Foxgloves
 Poppies (1904)
 The Lily Pond (1897)
 In the Conservatory, Kilmurry
 View in Pembroke Street, Dublin
 A garden path, probably Kilmurry
 A summer's day
 Hollyhocks
 Winter Survival
 Low water, Tramore, Waterford (1919)
 Station cabbies (1898)
 Poppies at Kilmurry: View across a wild Garden; and In flower
 Autumn by the Lake (1890)
 Figures beside a horse and chaise
 Horses grazing (1998)
 Cats Chasing Birds (1918)
 Peacocks
 The Spring Garden, Kilmurry
 Study of a Delphinium
 Sheep in a meadow
 The Grinding Wheel, Kilmurry
 Cattle grazing, Kilmurry
 Edge of the Woods
 Cattle in the shade, Kilmurray (1917)
 Lismore, Waterford
 Two cats, Kilmurry
 The Kilmurry Estate
 Meditation (1889)
 Cattle Resting in a Summer Meadow (1899)
 A Dead Magpie in a Tree
 A Trout Stream
 Procession through the Bluebells
 Crucifixion and hollyhocks
 Lilac Phlox
 The Farmyard
Other
 An Post Postage stamp
Other Works
 "Chucked; Green Eyed Jealousy": Ravens amongst trees Spring Garden (1916)
 The Sentinels: Rooks in the snow (1895)
 A Nap, Kilmurry, Co Kilkenny
 The Flowers of August (1900)
 Peacocks and Peahens on a Sunlit Lawn
 At Lismore, Co Waterford (1913)
 Fine Feathers
 Threashing in a riverside Field (1910)
 Peacocks at Kilmurry (1910)
 Doves at the Edge of a Garden
 A Cat stalking Pigeons
 Rose Peany
 Crows resting in a snow covered Landscape
 A Summer Border (1914)
 Young Jackdaws
 Aix les Bains
 A bluebell wood
 Kilmurry
 A French Chateau (1901)
 Cattle grazing
 Trees by a meadow
}}

 See also 

 Newlyn School
 List of Irish artists
 List of Irish botanical illustrators

Notesa.  The Royal Academy in London refused to show artists who painted in the French style, young painters had to form their own society in order to exhibit. This attitude waned throughout the 1890s.b.'''  The Morning Bath (1896) was amongst the few watercolours that were purchased by the Trustees of the Chantrey Bequest and was the first work by a female artist to be purchased and was presented to the Tate.

 References 

 Footnotes 

 Further reading 

 .
 .
 .
 National Gallery of Ireland, Irish Women Artists 1987
 County Life v.182, 25 August 1988, 124
 Desmond, Ray  (1994) Dictionary of British and Irish botanists and horticulturists: including plant collectors, flower painters, and garden designers''

1858 births
1941 deaths
People from County Kilkenny
Irish illustrators
19th-century Irish painters
20th-century Irish painters
Irish women painters
20th-century Irish women artists
19th-century Irish women artists
Members of the Royal Ulster Academy